Tánh Linh is a rural district of Bình Thuận province in the Southeast region of Vietnam. As of 2003, the district had a population of 99,679. The district covers an area of 1,174 km². The district capital lies at Lạc Tánh.

Climate

Tánh Linh has a tropical savanna climate.

Tánh Linh is located at the buffer zone between the heavy rain center of the South (Di Linh Plateau) and the coastal plains, characterised by the transition between the rains of the South Central Coast and the southern delta. The climate can be split into two distinct seasons: the rainy season and the dry season.

The rainy season runs between May and November. Many plants grow and thrive during this season. In contrast, during the dry season, which runs between December and April, they do not grow as well, and pests have a great impact on crop yields. 

In the south, the average annual rainfall ranges from 1,500-1,900mm, and in the north it is around 2,175mm, although sometimes it can reach or exceed 2,894mm.

References

Districts of Bình Thuận province